Desolación Island (Spanish for Desolation) is an island at the western end of the Strait of Magellan in the Magallanes y la Antártica Chilena Region, Chile.

Its northwestern point is called Cabo Pilar (Cape Pillar), and marks the entrance to the Strait of Magellan. Off Cape Pillar are three rocks in the sea, called Islotes Evangelistas (the Apostles).

Desolación Island in fiction
The Douglas Preston and Lincoln Child novel The Ice Limit described an expedition to Isla Desolación near Cape Horn in Chile. The map in the (paperback) edition incorrectly identifies easterly Isla Wollastone as Isla Desolación. The authors, in a note, say this is intentional.

James Michener's novel Hawaii depicts an attempt by a sailing ship to pass the Straits of Magellan, describing the western exit past Desolation Island as the most difficult part of the passage.

In Herman Melville's novel Moby-Dick, narrator Ishmael recalls a marble tablet at a whalemen's chapel in New Bedford which pays homage to a whaleman named John Talbot, who was lost overboard "near the Isle of Desolation, off Patagonia".

In Patrick O'Brian's novel Blue at the Mizzen, a British man-of-war is sent on a peace time mission to Chile and the Straits of Magellan.

In the Jackie Chan Adventures animated television series in Season 2 Episode 24 - Scouts Honor, Jackie Chan teleport the episode's villain, Vanessa Barone, with the Eye of Aurora to Desolación Island, saying that it is a little island off the coast of Chile and is "one of the most remote spots on earth".

See also
 List of islands of Chile

References

External links
 Islands of Chile @ United Nations Environment Programme
 World island information @ WorldIslandInfo.com
 South America Island High Points above 1000 meters
 United States Hydrographic Office, South America Pilot (1916)
 UN SYSTEM-WIDE EARTHWATCH Web Site

Islands of Tierra del Fuego
Strait of Magellan